František Čermák and Leoš Friedl were the defending champions, but Čermák did not participate this year.  Friedl partnered Michael Kohlmann, losing in the first round.

Martín García and Sebastián Prieto won the title, defeating Albert Montañés and Rubén Ramírez Hidalgo 6–4, 6–2 in the final.

Seeds

  Lukáš Dlouhý /  Pavel Vízner (semifinals)
  Mariusz Fyrstenberg /  Marcin Matkowski (semifinals)
  Leoš Friedl /  Michael Kohlmann (first round)
  Martín García /  Sebastián Prieto (champions)

Draw

Draw

References
Main Draw

ATP Buenos Aires
Buenos Aires - Doubles
2007 ATP Buenos Aires